Tyler Lortan (born 31 March 1992) is a South African cricketer who played for KwaZulu-Natal Inland from 2011 to 2014. Lortan then moved to New Zealand, and signed with Canterbury, playing in two matches for the team in the 2018–19 Super Smash tournament.

See also
 List of Canterbury representative cricketers

References

External links
 

1992 births
Living people
South African cricketers
KwaZulu-Natal Inland cricketers
Canterbury cricketers
Cricketers from Durban